Jane's Revenge is the name of a militant, extremist, abortion rights group that encourages and claims responsibility for acts of firebombing, vandalism, and arson in the United States, targeting crisis pregnancy centers, a church, and a Congressional office. The claimed attacks began in May 2022 after a leak of the ruling in Dobbs v. Jackson, which would soon overturn the 1973 Roe v. Wade ruling on abortion rights.

History 
On May 6, 2022, a draft opinion for the Supreme Court of the United States case Dobbs v. Jackson Women's Health Organization was leaked to the public. The draft pointed to an imminent overturning of two previous decisions, Roe v. Wade and Planned Parenthood v. Casey, which had inferred  constitutional protections for abortion rights. The group formed in response to the leak, posting their first communiqué on May 8. The name "Jane's Revenge" is a reference to the Jane Collective, an underground organization founded by Heather Booth that helped women obtain abortions prior to the Roe v. Wade decision.

After the June 24 decision overturning Roe v. Wade, the organization is attributed with having vandalized at least one crisis pregnancy center, in Virginia, and committing arson at a second center in Colorado. The FBI was called in to investigate the instance of arson in Colorado.

On June 28, The Intercept reported that Facebook had internally labeled the group as a terrorist organization, making the topic subject to the most stringent content filtering.

Major actions 

The May 8, 2022 firebombing of a crisis pregnancy center in Madison, Wisconsin was the first incident claimed by Jane's Revenge. In a statement issued after the attack, the group demanded the disbanding of anti-abortion organizations, with a threat of "increasingly extreme attacks", including a "Night of Rage", should Roe v. Wade be overturned by the Supreme Court.

Attacks on crisis pregnancy centers and a Congressman's office have been made in the group's name in New York, North Carolina, Washington, Wisconsin, Ohio, Maryland, Pennsylvania, Minnesota, Michigan, Iowa, Florida, the District of Columbia, Virginia, and potentially Oregon. Mary Ziegler, a law professor at University of California, Davis, has attributed the actions of the group to a growing distrust in government and democratic institutions.

The claimed main public mouthpiece is an anonymous blog, which lists actions taken signed with "Jane's Revenge" and sometimes takes credit.

Government response 
The Bureau of Alcohol, Tobacco, Firearms and Explosives has confirmed that the group is the subject of an ongoing investigation.

In June 2022, after the Dobbs v. Jackson decision was released, the Department of Homeland Security (DHS) released a memo concerning the group. They described Jane's Revenge as "a network of loosely affiliated suspected violent extremists [which] has been linked to arson attacks against the buildings of ideological opponents", and warned there was a risk of violence that "could occur for weeks following the release" of the Supreme Court decision.

In July 2022, the public information officer for the Metropolitan Nashville Police Department said "I don't think that there's any reason to believe, at this point, that it's a part of some group that's specifically going around to other places nationally".

See also 
 Anti-abortion violence
 Suffragette bombing and arson campaign

References 

2022 in the United States
Abortion in the United States
Abortion-rights movement in the United States
Abortion-rights violence
Attacks on buildings and structures in the United States
Attacks on churches in North America